Olivibacter domesticus is a bacterium from the genus of Olivibacter which has been isolated from compost from Porto in Portugal.

References

Sphingobacteriia
Bacteria described in 2007